The Crouse House, in Opa-Locka, Florida, was designed by architect Bernhardt E. Muller for owners J. W. and Jennie Crouse. The house includes Moorish Revival elements, and it was constructed in 1926 at the corner of Peri and Ahmed Streets in Opa-locka. The house is part of the Opa-locka Thematic Resource Area, and it was listed on the National Register of Historic Places August 17, 1987. Original features of the house included a bell tower at the Peri St. entrance and a dome above the garage entrance on Ahmad St., but neither feature survived numerous alterations.

Aviation pioneer Glenn Curtiss founded Opa-locka in 1925, and he hired architect Bernhardt Muller to design the community with a Moorish Revival motif inspired by stories from One Thousand and One Nights. Curtiss was not able to achieve Muller's vision for the community, although several sites were constructed.

See also

References

Further reading
 Miami: City of the Future, T. D. Allman (University Press of Florida, 2013)
 University of Miami Libraries: Bernhardt E. Muller Collection

National Register of Historic Places in Miami-Dade County, Florida
Houses completed in 1926
1926 establishments in Florida